Firqat al-Ghuraba is an active jihadist group aligned with al-Qaeda based in opposition held areas in the Idlib Governorate in northwestern Syria. The group mostly consists of foreign fighters from Europe with many, including the group's leader, originating from France and Belgium. The group is also believed to have sworn allegiance to al-Qaeda.

Background
The group was established by Omar Diaby who is originally from France of Senegalese heritage.

Leadership
The group, consisting of 80-100 fighters, was established in the Latakia Governorate of Syria after Diaby entered Syria. Most of the fighters reportedly were from France. 

Tensions rose between ISIL and al-Nusra in early 2014. Diaby chose to remain neutral in the conflict until more details would be made available, and said that he would ally with neither due to reports of violations against civilians by both ISIL and al-Nusra. 

Despite this, the group itself at one point in time was believed to be part of al-Nusra, and Diaby has criticized ISIL calling the group reactionary, and believing the group is composed only of untrained and ignorant youths that lacked religious education calling their actions deviant behaviour, while viewing al-Qaeda as more sophisticated and scholarly. 

He also criticized ISIL's use of graphic imagery in videos saying it only incites rage, however he justified ISIL's November 2015 Paris attacks, saying it was justified based on a Quranic verse saying "transgress for equal transgression" in response to French military operations. It is also believed that the group lost many of its members in defections to ISIL.

The group and its leader have had tensions with Hayat Tahrir al-Sham over HTS's policies as well as targeting of Firqat al-Ghuraba and its leadership by HTS, which Firqat al-Ghuraba and its supporters claim is being done in accordance with Turkish interests.

History
In mid 2015, Diaby was believed to have been killed but later reappeared in early 2016.

In 2017, despite losing many of its original members in defections to ISIL, the group reportedly saw an increase in membership from defectors from ISIL after the group's decline in territory.

Tensions with Hayat Tahrir al-Sham
In 2018, tensions broke out between Hayat Tahrir al-Sham, which consists of al-Nusra's successor Jabhat Fateh al-Sham, and Firqat al-Ghuraba over the fate of the daughter of one of Firqat's fighters. The fighter had stated should he be killed in combat he desired for his daughter to remain in Syria under the guardianship of Diaby and not be returned to his divorced wife in Belgium. HTS claimed that Diaby was extorting the mother of the fighter's daughter, his divorced wife by keeping the daughter from returning to Europe, HTS also claimed Diaby had kidnapped her and presented the case to an HTS-affiliated Sharia court. 

The court reportedly ruled in favor of HTS, and HTS also claimed that Diaby had violated the court's rulings by releasing information about the case before its conclusion and his refusal to hand the daughter over to HTS, which had been coordinating with Belgian and Turkish intelligence to negotiate her return to her mother. However Diaby claimed that it was an incorrect ruling as Belgium is not an Islamic country, and that she must be raised an Islamic country.

In May 2018, Diaby was arrested by HTS but later released in August 2018, after his release, Firqat al-Ghuraba made a statement that downplayed the tensions with HTS and did not release any information on the case, however Diaby still refused to release the daughter to HTS and he was again arrested in late October. 

In November 2018, tensions over the custody of the fighter's daughter between HTS and Firqat al-Ghuraba continued, with HTS arresting several fighters from Firqat al-Ghuraba at the group's headquarters, and several fighters from Firqat fought back against HTS but were encircled and arrested, during the raid fighters from al-Qaeda's Syrian branch the Guardians of Religion Organization came in to support Firqat al-Ghuraba, and the daughter was then taken by force into HTS custody. HTS religious officials released a fatwa justifying the raid and calling Firqat al-Ghuraba kidnappers. 

Following the fatwa from the scholar of HTS, an al-Qaeda affiliated scholar released a Fatwa opposing HTS's ruling and instead claimed that she should be placed in the custody of the Guardians of Religion Organization, which HTS claimed was protecting kidnappers in Firqat al-Ghuraba. Another HTS official claimed Firqat al-Ghuraba was extorting ransom for the girl from her mother demanding 50,000 Euros but the mother couldn't afford it, and later sent money to Firqat al-Ghuraba in an attempt to get the group to release her daughter.

By 24 November 2018, HTS and the Guardians of Religion Organization jointly agreed that the daughter would be released to her mother, and that HTS would drop kidnapping charges against Diaby and that the judges would declare him innocent on an account of ignorance, and that he had wrongfully interpreted the will of the fighter, by demanding money from the mother.

However, after the incident, Diaby has remained in HTS custody.

References

Jihadist groups in Syria